Leo Lee may refer to:

 Leo Lee Tung-hai (1921–2010), Hong Kong businessman
 Leo Ou-fan Lee (born 1942), Chinese academic